Osteoglossomorpha is a group of bony fish in the Teleostei.

Notable members
A notable member is the arapaima (Arapaima gigas), the largest freshwater fish in South America and one of the largest bony fishes alive. Other notable members include the bizarre freshwater elephantfishes of family Mormyridae.

Systematics
Most osteoglossomorph lineages are extinct today. Only the somewhat diverse "bone-tongues" (Osteoglossiformes) and two species of mooneyes (Hiodontiformes) remain.

The Ichthyodectiform fishes from the Jurassic and Cretaceous periods were once classified as osteoglossomorphs, but are now generally recognized as stem teleosts.
Basal and incertae sedis (Extinct)
 Genus †Paralycoptera Chang & Chou, 1977
 Genus †Jinanichthys Ma & Sun 1988  [Liaoxiichthys Su 1992]
 Genus ?†Kokuraichthys Yabumoto 2013
 Genus ?†Nierrkunia Su 1992
 Genus ?†Shuleichthys Murray, You & Peng 2010
 Genus ?†Suziichthys Su 1992
 Genus ?†Wilsonichthys Murray, Newbrey, Neumand & Brinkmand 2016
 Family †Jiaohichthyidae Ma 1983
 Genus †Jiaohichthys Ma 1983
 Family †Kuyangichthidae Liu, Ma & Liu, 1982
 Genus †Kuyangichthys Liu, Ma & Liu 1982
 Genus †Pulinia Ma 1983
Order †Lycopteriformes Chang & Chou 1977
 Family †Juiquanichthyidae Ma, 1984
 Genus †Jiuquanichthys Ma 1984
 Genus †Changma Ma 1984
 Genus †Qilianichthys Ma 1984
 Family †Lycopteridae Liu, Su, Huang & Chang, 1963
 Genus †Aokiichthys Yabumoto 1994
 Genus †Changichthys Su 1991
 Genus †Manchurichthys Saito 1936
 Genus †Neolycoptera Dolgopol de Saez 1939
 Genus †Pingolepis Chang & Chow 1974
 Genus †Tongxinichthys Ma 1980
 Genus †Yixianichthys Wu 2003
 Genus †Yungkangichthys Chang & Chou 1977
 Genus †Lycoptera Liu et al. 1963 [Asiatolepis Takai 1944; Sungarichthys Takai 1944] 
Order Hiodontiformes McAllister 1968 sensu Taverne 1979
 Genus †Chetungichthys Chang & Chou, 1977
 Genus †Plesiolycoptera Zhang & Zhou 1976
 Genus †Yanbiania Li 1987
 Family Hiodontidae Valenciennes 1846 sensu stricto (mooneyes)
 Genus †Eohiodon Cavender 1966
 Genus Hiodon Lesueur 1818

Order Osteoglossiformes Regan 1909 sensu Zhang 2004
 Genus Xixiaichthys Zhang 2004
 Genus Tanolepis Jin 1994 [Tanichthys Jin 1991 non Lin 1932]
 Family †Huashiidae Chang & Chou, 1977
 Genus †Kuntulunia Liu, Ma & Liu 1982
 Genus †Huashia Chang & Chou 1977
 Suborder Pantodontoidei
 Family Pantodontidae Peters 1876 (freshwater butterflyfishes)
 Genus Pantodon Peters 1877
 Suborder Osteoglossoidei Regan 1909
 Genus †Genartina Frizzell & Dante 1965
 Genus †Monopteros Volta 1796
 Genus †Musperia Sanders 1934
 Genus †Phareoides Taverne, 1973
 Genus †Chauliopareion 
 Family †Brychaetidae Bonde 1966
 Genus †Brychaetus Woodward 1901
 Family †Singididae Greenwood & Patterson 1967
 Genus †Singida Greenwood & Patterson 1967
 Family Phaerodontidae Jordan 1925a
 Genus †Phareodusichthys Gayet 1991
 Genus †Cretophareodus Li 1996
 Genus †Phareodus Leidy 1873
 Family Osteoglossidae Bonaparte 1832 sensu lato (arowanas)
 Suborder Notopteroidei Greenwood 1973
 Family †Ostariostomidae Schaeffer, 1949
 Genus †Ostariostoma Schaeffer 1949
 Superfamily Notopteroidea
 Family †Wakinoichthidae Yabumoto 1994
 Genus Wakinoichthys Yabumoto 1994 corrig.
 Family †Kipalaichthyidae Benveniste 1998
 Genus †Kipalaichthys Casier 1965
 Genus †Paradercetis Casier 1965
 Family Notopteridae Bleeker 1851 (Brown knifefish; featherbacks)
 Superfamily Mormyroidea
 Family Gymnarchidae Bleeker 1859 (Aba, African Knifefish)
 Family Mormyridae Bonaparte 1832 (freshwater elephantfishes)

Phylogeny
Phylogeny based on the following works:

References

 
Fish superorders
Extant Late Jurassic first appearances